Anahawan, officially the Municipality of Anahawan (Kabalian: Lungsod san Anahawan;), is a 5th class municipality in the province of Southern Leyte, Philippines. According to the 2020 census, it has a population of 8,429 people.

Geography

Barangays
Anahawan is politically subdivided into 14 barangays.
 Amagusan
 Calintaan
 Canlabian
 Capacuhan
 Kagingkingan
 Lewing
 Lo-ok
 Mahalo
 Mainit
 Manigawong
 Poblacion
 San Vicente
 Tagup-on
 Cogon

Climate

Demographics

Economy

References

External links
 Anahawan Profile at PhilAtlas.com
 [ Philippine Standard Geographic Code]
Philippine Census Information
Local Governance Performance Management System

Municipalities of Southern Leyte